Fort Walton Beach Airport  is a public-use airport located two miles (3 km) east of the central business district of Navarre, Florida in the United States. It is privately owned by John S. Williams.

Facilities and aircraft 
For the 12-month period ending May 23, 2002, the airport had 8,030 general aviation aircraft operations, an average of 22 per day.

The airfield is located on Lower Pritchard Long Point, allowing for its length despite being located in the normally thin stretch of land between Santa Rosa Sound and US Highway 98.

References

External links 

Airports in Florida
Transportation buildings and structures in Santa Rosa County, Florida
Navarre, Florida
Privately owned airports